Polysporella is a genus in the phylum Apicomplexa. Species in this genus infect birds. This genus has been poorly studied and little is known about it.

History

This genus was created by McQuistionin 1990.

Taxonomy

Only one species is recognised in this genus currently.

Description

The oocysts each have 9-15 sporocysts. Each sporocyst have 2 sporozoites.

References

Conoidasida
Apicomplexa genera